Heber Springs is a city in and the county seat of Cleburne County, Arkansas, United States. The population was 7,165 at the 2010 census.

Geography
Heber Springs is located near the center of Cleburne County at  (35.494329, −92.039168). Arkansas Highway 5 bypasses the center of the city to the east, leading north  to Mountain View and south  to Little Rock (via U.S. Route 67).

The city was named for a series of natural springs that are located on the east side of town on Main Street. Greers Ferry Lake and the Little Red River are located just north of the city, where rainbow trout are stocked in the Little Red and can be fished below the Greers Ferry Dam. The lake is a major tourism draw for swimming, boating, and personal watercraft, complemented by the Little Red River and Sugarloaf Mountain along the eastern portion of the city.

Demographics

2020 census

As of the 2020 United States census, there were 6,969 people, 2,868 households, and 1,890 families residing in the city.

2010 census
As of the census of 2010, there were 7,165 people, 2,793 households, and 1,851 families residing in the city. The racial makeup of the city was 97.90% White, 0.23% Black or African American, 0.44% Native American, 0.39% Asian, 0.03% Pacific Islander, 0.22% from other races, and 0.79% from two or more races.  1.80% of the population were Hispanic or Latino of any race.

There were 2,793 households, out of which 26.9% had children under the age of 18 living with them, 50.7% were married couples living together, 12.5% had a female householder with no husband present, and 33.7% were non-families. 30.5% of all households were made up of individuals, and 16.7% had someone living alone who was 65 years of age or older.  The average household size was 2.21, and the average family size was 2.72.

In the city, the population was spread out, with 21.5% under the age of 18, 6.7% from 18 to 24, 23.4% from 25 to 44, 23.1% from 45 to 64, and 25.3% who were 65 years of age or older.  The median age was 44 years. For every 100 females, there were 83.9 males.  For every 100 females age 18 and over, there were 80.3 males.

The median income for a household in the city was $29,599, and the median income for a family was $37,228. Males had a median income of $30,772 versus $19,720 for females. The per capita income for the city was $19,656.  About 8.6% of families and 13.3% of the population were below the poverty line, including 17.6% of those under age 18 and 12.8% of those age 65 or over.

History
Initially named Sugar Loaf, Heber Springs was founded by Max Frauenthal. In 1881, Frauenthal bought land in Van Buren County from John T. Jones. He founded the Sugar Loaf Springs Company and plotted a town site which was incorporated as "Sugar Loaf" on October 4, 1882.  In 1883, Frauenthal donated land for the courthouse square, built a frame courthouse to be used by the soon-to-be-created Cleburne County, and donated the land for Spring Park, thus securing the county seat for the new town.  Frauenthal chose the name Cleburne County to honor Confederate General Patrick Cleburne, who was killed in the Battle of Franklin in 1864.  In 1910, Sugar Loaf's name was changed to Heber Springs in order to avoid confusion with another town with a post office named Sugar Loaf. Frauenthal chose the new name to honor John T. Jones's son, Dr. Heber Jones, who was a prominent physician in Memphis, Tennessee, where Frauenthal had since moved.

Education 
Public education for elementary and secondary students is provided by:

 Heber Springs School District, the school district covering the city limits, with students graduating from Heber Springs High School.

Notable people
Brandon Bell (recording engineer), Grammy Award winning record engineer, mix engineer and producer
Everett G. Burkhalter, represented the 27th District of California in the U.S. House of Representatives
Paul Caraway, High Commissioner of the U.S. Civil Administration of the Ryukyu Islands
Mike Disfarmer, photographer
Max Frauenthal, Civil War hero and founding father of Heber Springs
Laurell K. Hamilton, author of the "Anita Blake: Vampire Hunter" series and "Meredith Gentry" series
Johnnie Bryan Hunt, founder of J.B. Hunt Transport Services
Johnelle Hunt, co-founder of J.B. Hunt Transport Services
Tommy Land, Arkansas Commissioner of State Lands
Mindy McCready, country music singer (Committed suicide in Heber Springs)
Josh Miller, Republican member of the Arkansas House of Representatives from District 66, including Heber Springs
Colin O'More, concert singer, educator, and broadcasting executive
Almeda Riddle, folk singer
Fred Williams, NFL football player

Points of interest
The Clarence Frauenthal House, built in 1914, is home of the Cleburne County Historical Society.

Greers Ferry Dam
Located on the Little Red River, the dam was dedicated in October 1963 by President John F. Kennedy just one month before his assassination. This event marks the only time a sitting president has visited Cleburne County.

Climate
The climate in this area is characterized by hot, humid summers and generally mild to cool winters.  According to the Köppen Climate Classification system, Heber Springs has a humid subtropical climate, abbreviated "Cfa" on climate maps.

References

External links
City of Heber Springs official website
Heber Springs Area Chamber of Commerce

Cities in Cleburne County, Arkansas
Cities in Arkansas
County seats in Arkansas
Populated places established in 1882
1882 establishments in Arkansas